Murcanyo, also known as Bander Murcaayo (alternatively Bandar Murcanyo is a coastal town in the northeastern Bari province of Somalia). It is situated in the autonomous Puntland region.

There are tribes who are descended from the Majerteen community in the Horn of Africa which are  Wadalmoge ).

Location
It lies 7 nautical miles (8 miles) southwest of Habo, 18 nautical miles (21 miles) southwest of Ras Filuk, and 38 nautical miles (44 miles) east of Qandala.

Geography
The town is situated along the beach of a long bay that borders the Gulf of Aden.

Murcanyo lies at the foot of the Jebel Murcanyo mountains (Jebel meaning mountain in Arabic), also known as Jebel Marayah. This mountain range stretches across the Bari region to the Indian Ocean coastline at Bargal. The range consists of cream-coloured limestone, as well as sandstone, shale and quartz.

History
Murcanyo was historically an important port town along the northeastern Somalia littoral. Through trading Exchange of Goodss, the town was connected to a merchant network that included regional ports like Mukalla, Jeddah and Mumbai Cairo . Local inhabitants produced and exported frankincense, indigo, and mats, and imported items such as dates, a special cloth, rice and metals.

In 1750, Murcanyo's resident population was estimated at 6000 to 8000 residents Murcanyo is a rapidly growing town.

According to the fact checked by the philosopher's and the educated people who contributed this information about murcanyo and its history there are minority clan whose trying to manipulate and claim residents of Murcanyo Town, by changing the information that has been stated so far.

Please note that if you try to corrupt this information there will be a consequence.

Administration
On April 8, 2013, the Puntland government announced the creation of a new region coextensive with Murcanyo and Cape Guardafui, named Gardafuul. Carved out of the Bari region, it consists of 4 districts.

Education
According to the Puntland Ministry of Education, there are 3 schools which consists of primary and secondary level.

See also 
Maritime history of Somalia
Geography of Somalia

Notes

References
Murcanyo, Somalia
Wadalmoge Community

Bari, Somalia
Headlands of Somalia